The Tajonar Facilities, is the training ground of the Spanish football club CA Osasuna. Located at the southern outskirts of Pamplona, the centre was opened in July 1982 by then-club president Fermín Ezcurra. The club's women's teams and youth sides also play at the facility. Since its opening in 1982, the Tajonar Soccer School has been preparing young football players here. 

In 2001, the centre was renovated and further expanded with the construction of three additional training pitches. In the following years, another  of land were acquired and, after several sales operations, the club kept the current  of the Tajonar Facilities.

Facilities
Tajonar Facilities Stadium with a capacity of 4,500 seats, is the home stadium of CA Osasuna B, the reserve team of CA Osasuna.
1 grass pitch.
5 artificial pitches.
Swimming pool and a water park.
Service centre with gymnasium.

References

External links
Tajonar Facilities at CA Osasuna

CA Osasuna
Tajonar
Football venues in Navarre
Buildings and structures in Pamplona
Sports venues completed in 1982